Mullah Dadullah may refer to:

Mullah Dadullah  (c. 1966 – May 12, 2007), Afghan Taliban leader
Mullah Dadullah (died August 24, 2012), Pakistani Taliban leader